Longworth is a village formerly part of Berkshire, but now part of Oxfordshire, England.

Longworth may also refer to:

Places

Canada
Longworth, British Columbia
Longworth railway station, a railway station on the Canadian National Railway mainline

United Kingdom
Longworth, Herefordshire, England
Longworth, Lancashire, a former township in Lancashire, England
Longworth House, an historic country house in Oxfordshire, England
Longworth Road, Oxford, England

United States
Longworth, Minnesota
Longworth, Texas

People
Longworth (surname)
Longworth family